Chikara may refer to:

The Four-horned Antelope, Tetraceros quadricornis
Chikara (given name)
Chikara (instrument), a stringed instrument from India.
Chikara-mizu (力水), a ritual at the beginning of a sumo match
Chikara (album), a compilation album by rock band Kiss
Chikara (professional wrestling), a professional wrestling organization

See also
Chinkara, or Indian gazelle